Toronto Tool Library (TTL) is a tool library system based in Toronto, Ontario, Canada. Tool libraries loan specialized tools for both experienced and inexperienced community members who are interested in home repair, maintenance, building projects, community projects, gardening and landscaping. In The Kitchen Library, small to medium-sized appliances are loaned for cooking and baking, serving equipment, culinary workshops. It partnered with the Toronto Public Library in 2015.

History
In 2012, TTL was founded by Ryan Dyment and Lawrence Alvarez. TTL received its first grant from the Centre for Social Innovation and started a registered non-profit arm called the Institute for a Resource Based Economy (IRBE) in 2012. In March 2012, a tool lending library was established in Toronto west at the Parkdale Activity Recreation Centre, 1499 Queen Street West, Toronto. In Ovctober 2013, a tool lending library and Makerspace with a wood shop, laser cutter, 3D printers, workshops and community gatherings was established in Toronto East at 1803 Danforth Avenue, Toronto.  The TTL partnered with the Toronto Public Library to open a brand new Tool Library on April 30, 2015 at the Downsview Public Library branch of the TPL, located at 2793 Keele Street.

TTL is supported by the Ontario Trillium Foundation, Pioneer +TO, tool donors and volunteers. In 2018, TTL was at risk of closing, but was able to remain open due to a crowdfunding campaign which raised over $37,000.

Governance
The Toronto Tool Library is governed by a Board composed of eight citizen members.

Services

Collections
The tool library adapted Share Starter's free "Tool Library Starter Kit"  which includes start up guidelines, frequently asked questions, and sample documents. The library uses "Local Tools" from "myTurn.com, PBC", a web-based inventory management system to track tool library members and to automatically display the tool availability online.
The library has loaned over 12,000+ specialized tools from power drills and ladders to pressure washers and roto-tillers to community members with all skill levels welcomed. The inventory of equipment includes automative, bike, carpentry and woodworking, electrical and soldering, home maintenance, metalworking, plumbing, remodelling, safety equipment, sustainable living, yard and garden. The types of equipment include: network equipment, books, camping, cars, googles, helmets, handtools, packages, power tools, wheelbarrows & wagons.

Training
The Makerspace offers affordable workshops open both to Tool Library members and the public on tool related skills and projects. In the Intro to Tools workshop, participants built a planter box; while in Routers 101, attendees created a cutting board.

Technology
The Toronto Tool Library  technology services include public access 3D Printing. In addition, Laser -Cutting and CNC Router Services are available at TTL.

Tool Ninja
The Toronto Tool Library offers “Tool Ninjas” whereby experts in a variety of tools and trades – 3D printing, Laser cutting, Furniture design, renovations are partnered for mentorship in tool use or hiring for a job.

Branches
 Tool lending library at the Parkdale Activity Recreation Centre, 1499 Queen Street West, in the West End of Toronto.
 Tool Library and Sharing Depot, 830 St. Clair West, Toronto.
 Tool Library, Sharing Depot and Makerspace, 192 Spadina Avenue, Toronto.

See also
List of public libraries in Ontario

References

External links
Official website
The Kitchen Library - official site

2012 establishments in Ontario
Non-profit organizations based in Toronto
Organizations established in 2012
Tool libraries